Mapple may refer to:

Andy Mapple (1962–2015), British-born, United States-based water skier
Deena Brush Mapple (born 1960), American water skier
Father Mapple, fictional preacher in Herman Melville's novel Moby-Dick
Mapple, parody technology company in The Simpsons, first appearing in "MyPods and Boomsticks"